Park Sung-jin (born 28 January 1985) is a South Korean footballer who plays as forward for FC Anyang in K League 2.

Career
He signed with National League side Goyang KB in 2007. After his team was dissolved in 2013, Park joined FC Anyang. He was appointed as a captain of the team in 2014.

Park, who played for FC Anyang for six years on May 25, 2019, retired from Anyang Sports Stadiumthrough a retirement ceremony.

References

External links 

1985 births
Living people
Association football forwards
South Korean footballers
Goyang KB Kookmin Bank FC players
FC Anyang players
Hwaseong FC players
Korea National League players
K League 2 players
K3 League players